= Linear range =

The linear range of a function is the portion of its overall range where the input is directly proportional to the output. The concept of a linear range is important in analytical science where it can apply to measuring equipment or chemical reactions.

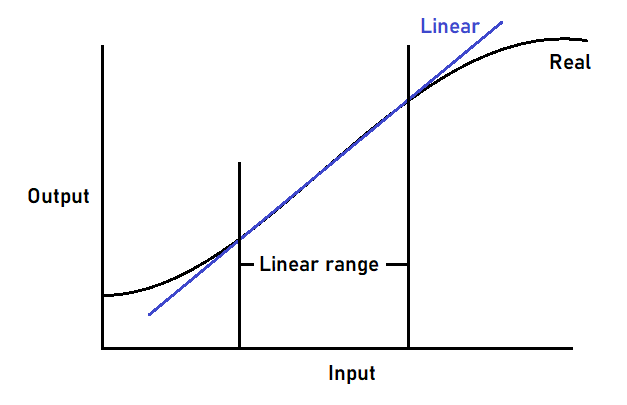
A graph showing the linear range of an input
